U.N. was a Harlem, New York City-based hip hop group founded by Cam'ron in 2009. The group came to formation after Cam'ron had a falling-out with fellow Harlem rapper and co-founder of the Diplomats Jim Jones in 2007.

Vado released a mixtape titled "Boss of All Bosse", on August 12, 2009, followed by a second mixtape called, "Boss of All Bosses 2", on January 12, 2010. Both mixtapes were released under the U.N. banner. After this, the U.N. released Boss of All Bosses 2.5, an expansion of the first two original mixtapes, released on May 12, 2010. Cam'ron and Vado have since announced future plans for a solo Vado mixtape and album, as well as a U.N. album distributed by Asylum.

Cam'ron and Vado have released their first official U.N. album entitled Cam'ron and the U.N. Presents: "Heat in Here" Vol. 1 on May 25, 2010, manufactured and distributed by Asylum Records. Guest appearances on the album include rappers Young Chris, Gucci Mane and Felony Fame.

The U.N. released "Gunz N' Butta" on April 19, 2011, through Diplomatic Man and E1 Music. It features the singles "Speakin' in Tungs" and "Hey Muma".

The single "Speaking in Tungs" featuring Cam'ron and Vado debuted at number 98 on Billboard's Hip-Hop/R&B songs chart, the following week it rose to number 82 on the same chart.

Discography

Studio albums

Singles

References 

The Diplomats
Gangsta rap groups